Henry Deringer (October 26, 1786 – February 28, 1868) was an American gunsmith. He is best known for inventing and giving his name to the derringer pistol.

Early life
Deringer was born in Easton, Pennsylvania, on October 26, 1786, to colonial gunsmith Henry Deringer Sr. (1756-1833) and Catherine McQuety (1759–1829).  The family moved to Philadelphia where his father continued work on the Kentucky rifle, both an ornate sporting model and a basic version for the U.S. Army. He sent his son to Richmond to apprentice with another gunsmith there.

Henry Deringer moved back to Pennsylvania after serving his apprenticeship and set up shop in 1806 in Philadelphia, on Tamarind Street. He married Elizabeth Hollobush at the First Reformed Church in Philadelphia on April 5, 1810.

According to McElroy's directory in 1841 Deringer had a house/gun shop at 370 North Front Street, Northern Liberties, Pennsylvania, PA.

Work
Deringer's early efforts were for military contracts, producing military pistols, muskets and rifles. Among those he produced was the Model 1814 Common Rifle and the Model 1817 Common Rifle. He produced trade rifles, designated for the Native American tribes, to fulfill the U.S. treaty obligations. His specialties became fine sporting rifles and dueling pistols. He stopped pursuing  government contracts by the mid-1840s.

In 1825 he designed the first of the large caliber, short barreled pistols that would lead to considerable wealth and fame for himself.  Using the basic flintlock action in common usage at the time, the pistols were muzzle loading single shots, or in some cases, double barreled in an over-under manner.

Later models used the percussion cap action, although both actions were manufactured and sold for some time. For arms of his own design, he adopted the newer percussion cap technology, putting his pistol on the modern cutting edge.  He was innovative; he perfected the percussion cap about 1820, and Deringer was marketing them by the 1830s, and possibly the mid-1820s.

Name and trademark
Deringer never claimed a patent for his pistols and the public bought them as fast as he produced them. Further development and copying of his design resulted in the derringer (note the double-r) pistol that was generically manufactured widely by other companies.

There was widespread copying of his designs, including outright counterfeiting with his proofmarks being copied. One company even hired a tailor called "John" Deringer so that it could put the Deringer name on its firearms. Some of Deringer's workmen also left the company to set up their own duplicates, whilst others copied his pistols as closely as possible with some even putting on its Deringer name and trademark. Deringer fought these infringements for most of his business life. The Deringer v. Plate ruling, in which the California Supreme Court ruled in the company's favor, became a landmark in trademark law.

Death

Deringer died in 1868 at the age of 81 and was buried in Laurel Hill Cemetery in Philadelphia.

See also
Concealed carry in the United States

References

External links
"The Booth Deringer—Genuine Artifact or Replica?" at FBI.gov
Bond Arms - Modern manufacturer of derringers
American Derringer - Modern manufacturer of derringers

1786 births
1868 deaths
19th-century American businesspeople
19th-century American inventors
Burials at Laurel Hill Cemetery (Philadelphia)
Businesspeople from Philadelphia
Derringers
Firearm designers
Gunsmiths
People from Easton, Pennsylvania
Weapon designers